Arturo Morua (born 3 May 1978) is a Mexican professional boxer. Arturo is a former WBA Fedecentro, WBO Latino, and WBO Inter-Continental Light Welterweight Champion. Morua has fought numerous times on Telefutura and Telemundo.

Professional career
In October 2001, Morua took on hard hitting, Cosme Rivera  (21-6-2) and defeated him by UD12 to win the WBA Fedecentro Light Welterweight Title.

WBC Light Welterweight Championship
In his first title attempt Arturo would lose a tough fight to WBC Champion Junior Witter.

WBO Light Welterweight Championship
Arturo then lost a twelve-round decision to WBO Champion Ricardo Torres.

Morua holds wins over great fighters like Emanuel Augustus, Omar Gabriel Weis, and Cosme Rivera.

Professional record

|- style="margin:0.5em auto; font-size:95%;"
|align="center" colspan=8|26 Wins (15 knockouts), 15 Losses, 1 Draw
|- style="margin:0.5em auto; font-size:95%;"
|align=center style="border-style: none none solid solid; background: #e3e3e3"|Res.
|align=center style="border-style: none none solid solid; background: #e3e3e3"|Record
|align=center style="border-style: none none solid solid; background: #e3e3e3"|Opponent
|align=center style="border-style: none none solid solid; background: #e3e3e3"|Type
|align=center style="border-style: none none solid solid; background: #e3e3e3"|Rd., Time
|align=center style="border-style: none none solid solid; background: #e3e3e3"|Date
|align=center style="border-style: none none solid solid; background: #e3e3e3"|Location
|align=center style="border-style: none none solid solid; background: #e3e3e3"|Notes
|-align=center
|Loss || 26-15-1 ||align=left| Jessie Vargas
| || 6 (8)
| || align=left|
|align=left|
|-align=center
|Loss || 26-14-1 ||align=left| Juan Jesus Rivera
| || 10 (10)
| || align=left|
|align=left|
|-align=center
|Loss || 26-13-1 ||align=left| Victor Cayo
| || 1 (9)
| || align=left|
|align=left|
|-align=center
|Loss || 26-12-1 ||align=left| Diosbelys Hurtado
| || 3 (10)
| || align=left|
|align=left|
|-align=center
|Loss || 26-11-1 ||align=left| Marcos Maidana
| || 6 (12)
| || align=left|
|align=left|
|-align=center
|Win || 26-10-1 ||align=left| Mario Alberto Mondragon
| || 3 (10)
| || align=left|
|align=left|
|-align=center
|Loss || 25-10-1 ||align=left| Alex De Jesus
| || 12 (12)
| || align=left|
|align=left|
|-align=center

References

External links
 

Boxers from Jalisco
Sportspeople from Guadalajara, Jalisco
Welterweight boxers
1978 births
Living people
Mexican male boxers